A list of films produced by the Israeli film industry in 2001.

2001 releases

Awards

Notable deaths

 September 8 – Dudu Dotan, Israeli entertainer and actor (b. 1949)

See also
2001 in Israel

References

External links
 Israeli films of 2001 at the Internet Movie Database

Lists of 2001 films by country or language
Film
2001